The phonological history of the English language includes various changes in the phonology of consonant clusters.

H-cluster reductions

Reductions of /hw/ 
 
The cluster  (spelled ⟨wh⟩ since Middle English) has been subject to two kinds of reduction:
This occurred with the word how in the Old English period, and with who, whom and whose in Middle English (the latter words having had an unrounded vowel in Old English).
The distinction is maintained, however, in Scotland, most of Ireland,  and some Southern American English.

Reduction of /hl/, /hr/ and /hn/ 
For example, Old English ,  and  become loaf, ring and nut in Modern English.

Reduction of /hj/ 
This is sometimes considered a type of glide cluster reduction, but it is much less widespread than wh-reduction, and is generally stigmatized where it is found. Aside from accents with general H-dropping, in the United States this reduction is mostly found in accents of Philadelphia and New York City; it also occurs in Cork accents of Irish English.

Y-cluster reductions

Many such clusters arose in dialects in which the falling diphthong  (the product of the merger of several Middle English vowel sequences) became the rising diphthong . (For more information, see Phonological history of English high back vowels.) They also occurred in words ending in -ion and -ious, such as nation and precious.

Yod-dropping
Particular cases of yod-dropping may affect all or some of the dialects that have the relevant clusters.

After , for example chute , chew , juice 
After , for example yew  (compare  in some conservative dialects)
After , for example rude 
After stop+ clusters, for example blue 

The previously mentioned accents that did not have the → change were not subject to this process. Thus, for example, in much Welsh English pairs like chews/choose, yew/you and threw/through remain distinct: the first member of each pair has the diphthong , while the second member has :
chews , choose 
 yew , you 
 threw , through   
Conversely, an initial  does not appear in Welsh English before  in words such as yeast and yield.

After , for example suit 
After , for example lute 
After , for example Zeus 
After , for example enthuse 

Yod-dropping in the above environments used to be considered nonstandard in England but now also occurs by educated RP-speakers. (The  after  is not normally dropped in RP in medial positions, however: compare pursuit .)

The lack of yod-dropping in those contexts has occasionally been held to be a shibboleth distinguishing Canadians from Americans. However, in a survey conducted in the Golden Horseshoe area of Southern Ontario in 1994, over 80% of respondents under the age of 40 pronounced student and news without yod.

General American thus undergoes yod-dropping after all alveolar consonants.

The same applies accordingly to British and other accents; the yod is often dropped after initial , for example, but it is not dropped in words like volume or value.

Some East Anglian accents such as Norfolk dialect extend yod-dropping not only to the position after ,  or  but also to the position after nonalveolar consonants as well: pairs like beauty/booty, mute/moot, cute/coot can then be homophonous. A well-known series of British television advertisements beginning in the 1980s featured Bernard Matthews, who was from Norfolk and described his turkeys as "bootiful" (for beautiful).

Yod-coalescence 
Yod-coalescence is a process that fuses the clusters  into the sibilants  respectively (for the meanings of those symbols, see English phonology). The first two are examples of affrication.

Unlike yod-dropping, yod-coalescence frequently occurs with clusters that would be considered to span a syllable boundary and so commonly occurs before unstressed syllables. Here are a few examples of yod-coalescence universal in all English dialects:

 in most words ending -ture, such as nature 
 in soldier 
 in words ending with -ssure such as pressure  (also in words ending with consonant+sure, consonant+sion, -tion)
 in words ending vowel+sure such as measure  (also vowel+sion)

In some other words, the coalesced pronunciation is common in English dialects around the world, but an older non-coalesced form still exists among some speakers of standard British English:
 educate  (also in standard RP) 
 azure  (also in RP )
 issue  (also in RP ), the intermediate form  being also common

Coalescence can even occur across word boundaries, as in the colloquial "gotcha"  (for got you ) and "whatcha"  (for what're you ).

In certain English accents, yod-coalescence also occurs in stressed syllables, as in tune and dune. That occurs only in Australian, Cockney, Estuary English, Zimbabwean English, some speakers of Hiberno-English, Newfoundland English, South African English, and to a certain extent in New Zealand English, many speakers in Scottish English, and even some varieties of English in Asia, like Philippine English (many speakers because of the influence by the phonology of their mother languages). That results in pronunciations such as the following:

 dew/due 
 tune 

In certain varieties such as Australian and Ugandan English, stressed  can also coalesce:
 resume 
 assume 

That can lead to additional homophony; for instance, dew and due come to be pronounced the same as Jew.

Yod-coalescence has traditionally been resisted in Received Pronunciation. It has certainly become established in words of the first group listed above (nature, soldier, pressure etc.), but it is not yet universal in those of the second group (educate etc.), and it does not generally occur in those of the third group (dew, tune etc.).

See also
List of yod-dropping and coalescence homophones on Wiktionary.

Other initial cluster reductions

Reduction of /wr/ and /wl/ 
Old and Middle English had an initial  cluster (note that /r/ does not denote  here), hence the spelling of words like write and wrong. This was reduced to just , apparently during the 17th century.

As a result of this reduction, pairs of words like rap and wrap, rite and write, etc. are homophones in practically all varieties of Modern English. They remain distinct in the Doric dialect of Scots, where the wr- cluster is pronounced . Alexander John Ellis reported distinctions between w and wr in Cumbria and in several varieties of Scots in the nineteenth century.

Old English also had a cluster , which reduced to  during Middle English. For example, the word lisp derives from Old English wlisp(ian).

Reduction of  

The  cluster was spelled cn- in Old English; this changed to kn- in Middle English, and this spelling survives in Modern English, despite the loss of the  sound. Cognates in other Germanic languages usually still sound the initial . For example, the Old English ancestor of knee was cnēo, pronounced , and the cognate word in Modern German is Knie, pronounced .

Most dialects of English reduced the initial cluster  to  relatively recently; the change seems to have taken place in educated English during the 17th century. Several German-language grammars of English from the late 17th and early 18th centuries transcribed English kn- as tn-, dn-, implying that a stage of assimilation (or perhaps debuccalization to ) preceded that of complete reduction.

The cluster is preserved in some Scots dialects, and Alexander John Ellis recorded it in parts of the Northern English counties of Cumbria and Northumberland in the late nineteenth century.

Reduction of /ɡn/ 
The change affected words like gnat, gnostic, gnome, etc., the spelling with gn- being retained despite the loss of the  sound. The cluster is preserved in some Scots dialects.

The song The Gnu jokes about this silent g and other silent letters in English. In fact the g in gnu may always have been silent in English, since this loanword did not enter the language until the late 18th century. The trumpeter Kenny Wheeler wrote a composition titled Gnu High, a pun on "new high".

S-cluster reductions
The following stop is then subject to regular aspiration (or devoicing of the following approximant) in its new word-initial environment. Some examples of such pronunciations are:

According to Wells, these reductions occur only in the broadest creole.

Final cluster reductions

NG-coalescence

NG-coalescence is a historical sound change by which the final cluster , pronounced  (the  being realized as a velar nasal by assimilation with the velar ), came to be pronounced as just  – that is, the final  was dropped, but the velar quality of the nasal remained. The change took place in educated London speech around the end of the 16th century, and explains why there is no  sound at the end of words like fang, sing, wrong and tongue in the standard varieties of Modern English.

The change in fact applies not only at the end of a word, but generally at the end of a morpheme. If a word ending in -ng is followed by a suffix or is compounded with another word, the  pronunciation normally remains. For example, in the words fangs, sings, singing, singer, wronged, wrongly, hangman, there is no  sound.

In other cases (when it is not morpheme-final), word-internal -ng- does not show the effects of coalescence, and the pronunciation  is retained, as in finger and angle. This means that the words finger and singer do not rhyme in most modern varieties of English, although they did in Middle English. The process of NG-coalescence might therefore be referred to as the singer–finger split.

This is particularly associated with English English accents in an area of Northern England (especially Lancashire), the West Midlands and Derbyshire in the East Midlands, and is also present in north-east varieties of Welsh English. This includes the cities of Birmingham (see Brummie), Manchester, Liverpool (see Scouse), Sheffield and Stoke-on-Trent. This also occurs in a small area of Kent. As this occurs around the mining area of Kent, it might be a result of large-scale migration by miners from other more northerly coalfields to Kent in the 1920s.

It is also associated with some American English accents in the New York City area.

On the other hand, in some accents of the west of Scotland and Ulster, NG-coalescence is extended to morpheme-internal position, so that finger is pronounced  (cf.

It is because of NG-coalescence that  is now normally regarded one of the phonemes of standard English. Nevertheless, some linguists (particularly generativists) do regard a word like sing as being underlyingly , positing a rule that deletes  after a nasal before a morpheme boundary, after the nasal has undergone assimilation.

The above-mentioned accents which lack NG-coalescence may more easily be analyzed as lacking a phoneme . The same may apply to those where NG-coalescence is extended to morpheme-internal position, since here a more consistent -deletion rule can be formulated.

G-dropping

G-dropping is a popular name for the feature of speech whereby  is used in place of the standard  in weak syllables. This applies especially to the -ing ending of verbs, but also in other words such as morning, nothing, ceiling, Buckingham, etc.

Relative to the great majority of modern dialects, which have NG-coalescence, G-dropping does not involve the dropping of any sound, simply the replacement of the velar nasal with the alveolar nasal. The name derives from the apparent orthographic consequence of replacing the sound written  with that normally written . The spelling -in'   is sometimes used to indicate that a speaker uses the G-dropping pronunciation, as in makin'  for making.

Old English verbs had a present participle in -ende and a verbal noun (gerund) form in -ing(e). These merged into a single form, written -ing, but not necessarily spoken as such – the  pronunciation may be inherited from the former distinct present participle form. The  variant appears to have been fashionable generally during the 18th century, with the alternative  being adopted in educated speech around the 1820s, possibly as a spelling pronunciation.

Today, G-dropping is a feature of colloquial and non-standard speech of all regions, including stereotypically of Cockney, Southern American English and African American Vernacular English. Its use is highly correlated with the socioeconomic class of the speaker, with speakers of lower classes using  with greater frequency. It has also been found to be more common among men than women, and less common in more formal styles of speech.

The fact that the  pronunciation was formerly associated with certain upper-class speech is reflected in the phrase huntin’, shootin’ and fishin’ (used in referring to country gentry who frequently engaged in such field sports). Further evidence that this pronunciation was once standard comes from old rhymes, as in this couplet from John Gay's 1732 pastoral Acis and Galatea, set to music by Handel:

Shepherd, what art thou pursuing,
Heedless running to thy ruin?

 was presumably pronounced "shepherd, what art thou pursuin', heedless runnin' to thy ruin", although this would sound very odd in an opera today.

But Weston has a new-cast gown
On Sundays to be fine in,
And, if she can but win a crown,
'Twill just new dye the lining.

Reduction of /mb/ and /mn/  
In later Middle English, the final cluster  was reduced to just  (the plum-plumb merger). This affects words such as lamb and plumb, as well as derived forms with suffixes, such as lambs, lambing, plumbed, plumber.

Such words include limb and crumb.

Both sounds are nonetheless still pronounced before vowels in certain derivatives, such as autumnal, damnation, solemnity.

Generalized final cluster reduction
General reduction of final consonant clusters occurs in African American Vernacular English and Caribbean English. The new final consonant may be slightly lengthened as an effect.

Examples are:

{|
|-
|test ||→ tes' ||  ||→ 
|-
|desk ||→ des' ||   ||→ 
|-
|hand ||→ han' ||   ||→ 
|-
|send ||→ sen' ||   ||→ 
|-
|left ||→ lef''' ||   ||→ 
|-
|wasp ||→ was' ||  ||→ 
|}

The plurals of test and desk may become tesses and desses by the same rule that gives plural messes from singular mess.HLW: Word Forms: Processes: English AccentsEbonics Notes and Discussion

Medial cluster reductions
When a consonant cluster ending in a stop is followed by another consonant or cluster in the next syllable, the final stop in the first syllable is often elided. This may happen within words or across word boundaries.

Historically, similar reductions have taken place before syllabic consonants in certain words, leading to the silent  in words like castle and listen. This change took place around the 17th century. In the word often, the  sound later came to be re-inserted by some speakers as a spelling pronunciation.

This led to the modern sound of soft .

Consonant insertions

Prince–prints merger
For many speakers, an epenthetic  is inserted in the final cluster , making it identical or very similar to the cluster . For example, the words prince and prints have come to be homophones or nearly so.

The epenthesis is a natural consequence of the transition from the nasal  to the fricative ; if the raising of the soft palate (which converts a nasal to an oral sound) is completed before the release of the tongue tip (which enables a fricative sound), an intervening stop  naturally results. The epenthesis does not occur between syllables, in words like consider.

Other insertions

Epenthesis of a stop between a nasal and a fricative can also occur in other environments, for example: 
 may become  (so pinscher is often pronounced like pincher)
 may become  (so Samson becomes "Sampson", hamster becomes "hampster")
 may become  (so Kingston becomes "kinkston")

Epenthesis may also happen in the cluster , which then becomes , so else rhymes with belts.

An epenthetic  often intervenes in the cluster  in the word dreamt, making it rhyme with attempt.

Some originally epenthetic consonants have become part of the established pronunciation of words.

For the insertion of glottal stops before certain consonants, see Glottalization below.

Alterations of clusters

Assimilation
In English as in other languages, assimilation of adjacent consonants is common, particularly of a nasal with a following consonant. This can occur within or between words. Voicing assimilation determines the sound of the endings -s (as in plurals, possessives and verb forms) and -ed (in verb forms): these are voiced following a voiced consonant (or vowel), but voiceless after a voiceless consonant, as in gets, knocked.

Glottalization
More precisely, it occurs in RP when  appears in the syllable coda, is preceded by a vowel, liquid or nasal, and it is followed by another consonant except (normally) a liquid or semivowel in the same word, as in mattress.

Another possibility is pre-glottalization (or glottal reinforcement), where a glottal stop is inserted before a syllable-final stop, rather than replacing it. It can also occur before a pause as in quite! spoken alone but not in quite easy.

According to Wells, this pre-glottalization originated in the 20th century (at least, it was not recorded until then). Glottalization of  spread rapidly during the 20th century.

S-cluster metathesis

Final consonant clusters starting with  sometimes undergo metathesis, meaning that the order of the consonants is switched.

This example has a long history: the Old English verb áscian also appeared as acsian, and both forms continued into Middle English, the latter, metathesizing to "ask". The form axe appears in Chaucer: "I axe, why the fyfte man Was nought housband to the Samaritan?" (Wife of Bath's Prologue, 1386), and was considered acceptable in literary English until about 1600.

S-cluster metathesis has been observed in some forms of African American Vernacular English, although it is not universal, one of the most stigmatized features of AAVE and often commented on by teachers. Examples of possible AAVE pronunciations include:

Merger of /str/ and /skr/

The form has been found to occur in Gullah and in the speech of some young African Americans born in the Southern United States. It is reported to be a highly stigmatized feature, with children who use it often being referred to speech pathologists.

Yod-rhotacization

Compare yod-dropping and yod-coalescence, described above (and also the coil–curl merger, which features the reverse process,  → ).

See also
 Phonological history of the English language
 Phonological history of English consonants
 Phonological history of English fricatives and affricates
 H-dropping

References 

Splits and mergers in English phonology
Scottish English
Phonotactics